Warrawong is a  suburb of Wollongong in the Illawarra region of New South Wales, Australia. It is situated on the northeast corner of Lake Illawarra.

Warrawong is 90 kilometers from Sydney CBD.

Warrawong is home to Warrawong Plaza, one of three major regional shopping centres.  Other facilities include the Port Kembla Hospital, Hoyts cinemas, and the Gala cinemas.

History
Various meanings are given for the aboriginal word "Warrawong" including "a whiting", "side of a hill", " a windy place on a hill", " wind swept" and "windy hills". 

Long a farming area, after the first land grants were made in the area in 1815, Warrawong began to be developed as a suburb only in the 1930s.

The Warrawong area has been known variously as Steeltown, Kembla Estate, New Kembla and finally, Warrawong.

Demographics
Warrawong has a high proportion of immigrants.

 Aboriginal and Torres Strait Islander people made up 5.4% of the population.
 56.1% of people spoke only English at home. Other languages spoken at home included Macedonian 8.8%, Italian 6.7%, Portuguese 4.5% and Arabic 2.4%.
 The most common responses for religion were Catholic 32.8%, No Religion 21.0%, Anglican 10.4% and Eastern Orthodox 9.1%.

References

Suburbs of Wollongong